The Hartree Centre is a high performance computing, data analytics and artificial intelligence (AI) research facility focused on industry-led challenges. It was formed in 2012 at Daresbury Laboratory on the Sci-Tech Daresbury science and innovation campus in Cheshire, UK. The Hartree Centre is part of the Science and Technology Facilities Council (STFC) which itself is part of United Kingdom Research and Innovation (UKRI).

Background

The Hartree Centre takes its name from English mathematician and physicist Douglas Rayner Hartree. It was formed in 2012 with £37.5 million government funding for research into supercomputing. The centre's purpose is to provide UK industry and academia with access to advanced high performance computing technologies, expertise and training to boost UK economic growth and "to develop technologies such as batteries for mobile phones".

In 2014, the centre was allocated an additional £19 million for research into energy efficient computing and big data, such as that which will be generated by the Square Kilometre Array.

In the 2014 Autumn Statement, government announced a further investment of £115 million for the centre over five years, to fund future scientific discovery in research areas including cognitive computing and big data analytics. This was part of the Northern Powerhouse strategy to boost economic growth in the North of England.

In 2014, the Hartree Centre became an official Intel Parallel Computing Centre.

The Hartree Centre is a base for one of the IBM Research teams in the UK and the University of Liverpool Virtual Engineering Centre.

According to the Annual Report from 2017-2018, the Hartree Centre was funded with £115.5mm for the financial year ending 31 March 2018.

Technologies
The Hartree Centre hosts a number of supercomputing platforms including:
 Scafell Pike, a Bull Sequana X1000 with Intel Skylake CPUs and Intel Xeon Phi accelerators
 Lenovo NeXtScale
 Lenovo System x iDataPlex system
 JADE, an Atos Bull system using 63 Nvidia DGX-1 
 JADE2 Atos Bull Nvidia DGX-1 Max-Q
 Atos Quantum Learning Machine
 Visual Computing Centre
 IBM POWER8 + NVLink + Tesla P100
 IBM POWER8 + Nvidia K80

In 2017, Scafell Pike became the first Bull Sequana X1000 to be installed in the UK. 
The centre also houses a large scale GPFS storage system.

Past Technologies

The Hartree Centre formerly hosted supercomputer Blue Joule, an IBM Blue Gene/Q. In June 2012, the year of its installation at Daresbury Laboratory, the TOP500 project ranked Blue Joule as the most powerful non-distributed computing system in the UK and 13th in the world.

In 2016, Blue Joule was upcycled into the DiRAC facility at the Institute for Computational Cosmology, Durham University.

Hartree has hosted experimental technologies such as a Maxeler FPGA system, an ARM 64-bit platform, and a ClusterVision-built novel cooling demonstrator using mineral oil.

Energy Efficient Computing

In 2012, the centre was awarded government funding to strengthen UK competitiveness in areas including big data and energy efficient computing.

Energy efficient computing is becoming an influential research topic for the future sustainability of high performance computing, the Hartree Centre is carrying out research which takes a holistic view of parallel computing systems, including the optimisation of software to make it run more efficiently, low power architectures, data storage, cooling methods and other factors.

In 2015 Lenovo entered into partnership with the centre to develop energy efficient computing solutions using an ARM-based server prototype.

Work With Industry 

The Hartree Centre works with academic researchers and companies in a wide range of industries, on projects including software development and optimisation, big data analytics, collaborative R&D and training.

Notable Projects

 As of 2013, the Hartree Centre had a long-term partnership with Unilever to develop their R&D processes and make better use of high performance computing, specifically computer aided formulation. One of the research projects undertaken resulted in an “app” that focuses on ease of use to put complex supercomputing tools in the hands of chemists. The tool is claimed to enable product experimentation that would previously take a week to be carried out in 40 minutes.
 In 2014 the centre ran a competition in partnership with the Open Data Institute and IBM. Entrepreneurs were allowed to submit their concepts to use publicly available open data for commercial applications. The winning ideas were given time on the Hartree Centre machines with IBM data scientists to prove their concept was commercially viable. One winning company, UK SME Democrata, has created a tool through the project, which analyses and maps open data from a variety of archaeological, geological and land based sources to help large construction and infrastructure companies and projects to predict risk and avoid disturbing sites of historical significance. The tool uses two components of IBM Watson and Hadoop data repositories.
 In June 2015, Minister for Universities and Science Jo Johnson announced a renewed partnership between the Hartree Centre and IBM which provides the centre with access to £200 million worth of IBM's data-centric and cognitive computing technologies and expertise, including IBM Watson.
 In May 2016, the Hartree Centre announced a collaboration with Alder Hey Children's Hospital to create the UK's first "cognitive hospital", using the IBM Watson cognitive computing platform to improve the patient journey and experience. The project won "Most Innovative Collaboration" at the North West Coast Research and Innovation Awards 2017. The Alder Play app was launched and made available to the public in December 2017, featuring the Ask Oli chat feature in beta.
 From 2016 to 2019 the centre was one of five partners in the LCR 4.0 project to accelerate Industry 4.0 technologies into SMEs in the Liverpool City Region. The project's success was recognised locally and nationally and named by the Financial Times as one of Europe's 100 Digital Champions.
 In June 2019, the Industrial Digitalisation Accelerator was launched, a collaboration with Siemens and Atos enabling businesses to access, explore and integrate Industry 4.0 technologies in a low-risk environment.

See also
Supercomputing in Europe

External links 

 The Hartree Centre

References

Computer science institutes in the United Kingdom
Information technology organisations based in the United Kingdom
Research institutes in Cheshire
Science and Technology Facilities Council
Supercomputer sites